Senator Strahan may refer to:

Reuben S. Strahan (1835–1895), Oregon State Senate
Robert H. Strahan (1843–1884), New York State Senate